This is a list of notable alumni and staff of the University of the Witwatersrand.

Arts

 Aggrey Klaaste, journalist, editor of the Sowetan, 1988–2002
 Angelique Rockas, pioneer of multi-racial and multi-national theatre London
 Anton Hartman, musician
 Athol Williams, award-winning poet and social philosopher
 Aura Herzog, Israeli writer
 Benedict Wallet Vilakazi, Zulu poet, novelist, and educator, first black South African to receive a PhD
 Candice Breitz, artist, video and photography
 Cecil Skotnes, artist
 Claire Johnston, singer, known as the face and voice of Mango Groove
 Clare Loveday, composer
 Clement M. Doke, linguist
 Clinton Fein, artist, activist
 Hans George Adler, musicologist; collector and classical music promoter, Honorary Doctor of Philosophy (1978)
 Ed Jordan, musician, composer, singer-songwriter, actor, TV and radio presenter; wrote and produced the orchestral score for Spud
 Elisabeth Eybers, poet
 Eric Fernie, art historian
 Ernest Fleischmann (1924–2010), executive director of the Los Angeles Philharmonic
 Ernst Oswald Johannes Westphal, linguist, expert in Bantu and Khoisan languages
 Ezekiel Mphahlele, writer and academic
 Ferial Haffajee, editor of the City Press; former editor of The Mail and Guardian in South Africa
 Fred Khumalo, journalist and author
 Gary Barber, American film producer of South African descent; chairman and CEO of Metro-Goldwyn-Mayer since 2010; co-founder of Spyglass Entertainment
 Gavin Hood, writer, producer and director, directed Tsotsi
 Gideon Emery, actor
 Harold Jenkins (Shakespeare scholar), notable Shakespeare scholar 
 Herman Charles Bosman, writer and journalist
 Ingrid de Kok, author and poet
 Ivan Vladislavic, novelist
 Janet Suzman, actress, director
 Jani Allan, writer and journalist
 Jillian Becker novelist, essayist, critic and expert on terrorism
 Johnny Clegg, musician
 Judith Mason, painter
 Kendell Geers, artist
 Kevin Volans, composer
 Lewis Wolpert, developmental biologist, author, and broadcaster
 Lionel Abrahams, novelist, poet, editor, critic, essayist and publisher
 Lionel Ngakane, filmmaker
 Lisa de Nikolits, writer
 Lucy Allais, philosopher
 Manfred Mann, keyboard player for the bands Manfred Mann and Manfred Mann's Earth Band
 Mbali Dhlamini, artist
 Mbongeni Buthelezi, artist known for "painting" in plastic
 Nadine Gordimer, Nobel Prize in Literature, 1991
 Phaswane Mpe, poet and novelist
 Pieter-Dirk Uys, entertainer, AIDS activist
 Raymond Heard, journalist, editor, media executive, political strategist
Ruona J. Meyer, journalist, International Emmy Award nominee
Sibongile Khumalo, singer
 Stan Katz, broadcaster
 Shannon Esra, actress
 Thuso Mbedu, actress
 William Kentridge, artist
 Rayne Kruger (1922–2002), author
 Cecily Sash (1924–2019), painter, professor
 Zoe Ramushu, writer, director, producer

Architecture and design
 Denise Scott Brown, architect, planner, writer and educator
 Rory Byrne, former chief designer for the Ferrari Formula One team
 Pancho Guedes, Portuguese architect, participant of Team X
 Allan Greenberg, American architect and one of the leading classical architects of the twenty-first century.
 Theo Crosby, was an architect, editor, writer and sculptor, engaged with major developments in design across four decades

Business and entrepreneurship
 Adam Levy, property developer
 Adrian Gore, CEO of Discovery Holdings Ltd; Chairman of Destiny Health Inc. in the USA and Prudential Health Limited in the UK
 Affiong Williams, founder and CEO of Reel Fruit, a Nigerian company that focuses on processing and distribution of locally grown fruits
 Bridget van Kralingen, Senior Vice President, IBM Global Business Services
 Charles Chinedu Okeahalam, economist and businessman, CEO of AGH Capital Group; former Liberty Life Professor of Financial Economics and Banking, University of the Witwatersrand
 David Frankel (entrepreneur), is a South African-born American businessman. He is the co-founder of Founder Collective, a seed-stage venture capital fund with offices in New York City and Cambridge
 Derek Keys (born 1931), finance minister of South Africa, 1992-1994, in the cabinets of F W de Klerk and Nelson Mandela
 Desmond Lachman (born 1948), economist and former IMF Deputy Director
 Donald Gordon, founder of life insurance company Liberty Life in 1958 with R100,000 when he was 27 years old; awarded a knighthood in 2005
 Elizabeth Bradley, Non-Executive Chairman of Toyota SA Limited; former Executive Director of AngloGold
 Gail Kelly (born Gail Currer), Australian and South African businessperson; first woman CEO of a major Australian bank or top 15 company (2002)
 Gary Barber, Chairman and CEO of Metro-Goldwyn-Mayer Bachelor of Commerce; certificate in the Theory of Accountancy
 Gene Sherman, philanthropist, academic and expert on art, fashion and architecture.
 Gordon Schachat, co-founder of African Bank Limited and prominent art collector
 Graham Mackay, former Chairman and Ex-CEO of SABMiller plc, the world's second largest beer brewer
 Ivan Glasenberg, CEO of Glencore, one of the world's largest commodity trading companies; on the boards of mining companies Xstrata plc and Minara Resources Ltd
 Koos Bekker, former CEO of Naspers
 Lael Bethlehem, former CEO of the Johannesburg Development Agency; Investment Executive at Hosken Consolidated Investments
 Ludwig Lachmann, economist and important contributor to the Austrian School
 Maria Ramos, economist and businesswoman; CEO of ABSA Group since 2009; former CEO of Transnet
 Martin Morgan, Chief Executive Officer and Director of DMGT
 Meyer Feldberg, Senior Advisor to Morgan Stanley
 Nathan Kirsh, South African-born Swazi business magnate, with a property empire spanning the UK, Swaziland and Australia; has Swazi citizenship; has residency status in the UK and the USA
 Nthato Motlana, giant of South African business and the anti-apartheid struggle; one of the accused, with Mandela and 18 others, in the 1952 Defiance Campaign Trial
 Patrice Motsepe, South African mining magnate; according to Forbes magazine, worth more than R17-billion after adding a further R7-billion to his net worth in 2009
 Patrick Soon-Shiong, South African-American surgeon; founder, chairman, and CEO of Abraxis BioScience
 Percy Tucker, Founder of Computicket, the first electronic theatre booking system in the world in 1971
 Rodney Sacks, chairman, and CEO of Monster Beverage
 Ron Dembo, is an academic and entrepreneur
 Ronnie Apteker, founder of Internet Solutions, one of South Africa's largest internet service providers
 Sir Ernest Oppenheimer, diamond and gold mining entrepreneur; financier; philanthropist; controlled De Beers; founded the Anglo American Corporation of South Africa
 Sir Mark Weinberg, South African-born British financier; founder of Abbey Life Assurance Company
 Sir Winfried Franz Wilhem Bischoff, Anglo-German banker; chairman of Lloyds Banking Group plc; former chairman and former interim CEO of Citigroup; knighted in 2000
 Sol Kerzner, hotel and gambling magnate; created the most successful hotel group in South Africa, Sun International; Chairman of the Board of Kerzner International, based in the Bahamas
 Tony Trahar, former chairman of Anglo American; educated at St John's College and the University of the Witwatersrand
 David Sikhosana, Founder & Chairman of The DSH Group. A Diversified Investment Holdings company
 Llewellyn Devereaux, author, inventor, speaker and the founder of The Genie Group.

Education

 Prof Adam Habib, Vice-chancellor and Principal University of the Witwatersrand
 Prof Brenda Gourley, higher education pioneer; accountant
 Colin Bundy, Warden of Green College, Oxford; former Director and Principal of School of Oriental and African Studies, former Deputy Vice-Chancellor of University of London; former Vice-Chancellor and Principal of University of the Witwatersrand
 David B. A. Epstein, is a mathematician known for his work in hyperbolic geometry, 3-manifolds, and group theory, amongst other fields
 Garth Saloner, Dean of the Stanford Graduate School of Business
 Hazel Sive,  is a South African-born biologist and educator
 Jane den Hollander, Vice-Chancellor and President, Deakin University, Australia
 Prof. Loyiso Nongxa, Vice-chancellor and Principal University of the Witwatersrand
 Prof. Mamokgethi Phakeng, Vice-chancellor of the University of Cape Town, mathematics education researcher and academic.* Max Price, Vice-Chancellor, University of Cape Town, Johannesburg; former dean, Faculty of Health Sciences, University of the Witwatersrand
 Mark Mostert Professor of Special Education at Regent University author and lecturer on Eugenics, Facilitated Communication and "useless eaters Meyer Feldberg, dean of Columbia Business School 1989-2004; president of the Illinois Institute of Technology 1987-1989
 Michael Stevenson, President and Vice-Chancellor, Simon Fraser University, Burnaby, BC
 Patrick Deane, Vice-Chancellor and President, McMaster University, Canada
 Peter Sarnak, awarded the Wolf Prize 2014, Honorary doctorate 2014: University of the Witwatersrand
 Prof Tshilidzi Marwala, Vice-chancellor and Principal University of Johannesburg

Engineering
 John Burland, is an Emeritus Professor and Senior Research Investigator at the Department of Civil and Environmental Engineering of Imperial College London.[2]
 Lewis Wolpert, was a South African-born British developmental biologist, author, and broadcaster
 Michael Bear (lord mayor), is a civil engineer and management leader in both the construction and property industries in the UK and abroad
 Rob Pullen,  major contributor to the practice of water resources engineering and especially to the wider engineering profession in South Africa
 Matthew Rabinowitz, is a doctor of engineering and co-founder and executive chairman of Natera, a clinical genetic testing company
Sir Jack Zunz, was a British civil engineer and former chairman of Ove Arup & Partners. He was the principal structural designer of the Sydney Opera House

Historians
 C. I. Hamilton, British naval historian
 Cornelis de Kiewiet
Nthabiseng Mokoena, Lesotho's only female professional archaeologist
 Bruce Murray 
 Charles van Onselen
 Charles Hilliard Feinstein (18 March 1932 – 27 November 2004) was a noted South African and British economic historian. He was born in Johannesburg, received his early education at Parktown Boys' High School and studied at Witwatersrand University and Cambridge University where he completed his doctorate.

Legal profession

 Michael Arnheim (1944– ), London Barrister and author
 George Bizos (1927–2020), human rights advocate, represented Nelson Mandela during the Rivonia Trial
 Amina Cachalia (1930–2013), anti-Apartheid activist, women's rights activist, and politician
 Arthur Chaskalson (1931–2012), President of the Constitutional Court of South Africa and Chief Justice of South Africa
 Azhar Cachalia (1956– ), Judge at the South African Supreme Court of Appeal; anti-apartheid activist; a founding member of the United Democratic Front; served as Secretary for Safety and Security
 Beric John Croome (1960–2019), Advocate of the High Court of South Africa; CA (SA); taxpayers' rights legal pioneer; completed a Higher Diploma in Tax Law at Wits in 1989; awarded the Edward Nathan Friedland Tax Prize for the year; 2002 nominee for the University's Convocation Honour Award for his contribution to commerce and industry
 John Dugard (1936– ), professor of international law and writer
 Richard Goldstone (1938– ), judge and international war crimes prosecutor; considered one of several liberal judges who issued key rulings that systematically undermined Apartheid
 Anthony Gubbay (1932– ), Chief Justice of the Supreme Court of Zimbabwe
 Nicholas Haysom (1952– ), diplomat and UN official; Chief Legal Adviser to President Nelson Mandela; until May 1994, an associate professor of law and deputy director at the Centre for Applied Legal Studies (CALS) at Wits
 Bob Hepple (1934–2015), legal academic and leader in the fields of labour law, equality and human rights  
 Joel Joffe, Baron Joffe (1932–2017), lawyer and peer in the House of Lords; defence attorney for the leadership of the African National Congress at the Rivonia Trial
 Sydney Kentridge (1922– ), advocate and Acting Justice of the Constitutional Court
 Dikgang Moseneke (1947– ), Chancellor of the University of the Witwatersrand and Deputy Chief Justice of South Africa
Mervyn E. King (1937– ), former Justice of the Supreme Court of South Africa and director of the Global Reporting Initiative
 Jody Kollapen (1957– ), Justice of the Constitutional Court of South Africa, former commissioner of the South African Human Rights Commission, and former head of Lawyers for Human Rights
 Thuli Madonsela (1962– ), advocate, professor of law, and former Public Protector of South Africa
 Ismail Mahomed (1931–2000), appointed to the Constitutional Court in 1994; was made Chief Justice in 1998, a position he held until his death in 2000
 Bheki Maphalala, Chief Justice of the Supreme Court of the Kingdom of Eswatini
 Margaret H. Marshall (1944– ), Chief Justice of the Massachusetts Supreme Judicial Court
 Michael Sutherland (1954– ), Australian politician and former Speaker of the Western Australian Legislative Assembly
Nomatemba Tambo, diplomat, politician, and High Commissioner of South Africa to the United Kingdom
 Charles Theodore Te Water, Honorary Doctor of Law (1955)
 Johan D. van der Vyver, I.T. Cohen Professor of International Law and Human Rights at Emory University School of Law, formerly a professor of law at Wits

Medicine

 Alan Menter (MBBCh, 1966, Wits), dermatologist; expert on psoriasis; Chairman of the Division of Dermatology; Director of the Dermatology Residency program for Baylor University Medical Center; Clinical Professor of Dermatology at the University of Texas Southwestern Medical School
 Basil Hirschowitz, inventor of the first fiberoptic endoscope
 Catherine Nyongesa, radiation oncologist
 Glenda Gray, President of the South African Medical Research Council, pediatrician
 Irma Brenman Pick, psychoanalyst
Jack Penn, known for his innovative techniques in plastic surgery, notably the Brenthurst splint
 James Ware, surgeon
 John Brereton Barlow - Barlow's syndrome
 Jonathan Lewis, surgical oncologist; biomedical researcher; developer of cancer drugs
 Joseph Sonnabend, physician, scientist and HIV/AIDS researcher, notable for pioneering community-based research, the propagation of safe sex to prevent infection, and an early multifactorial model of AIDS.
 Julien Hoffman, paediatric cardiologist; cardiac physiologist; expert in the epidemiology of congenital cardiovascular malformations
 Lars Georg Svensson, cardiac surgeon
 Lionel Hersov, child psychiatrist, researcher and academic
 Mary Malahlela, first black woman doctor in South Africa
 Norman E. Rosenthal, author, psychiatrist and scientist who in the 1980s first described seasonal affective disorder (SAD), and pioneered the use of light therapy for its treatment
 Nthatho Harrison Motlana, activist, academic, businessman, Mandela family physician
 Phillip Tobias, palaeoanthropologist and Professor Emeritus at the University of the Witwatersrand in Johannesburg; known for his work at South Africa's hominid fossil sites; anti-apartheid activist
 Priscilla Kincaid-Smith, "the mother of nephrology", appointed Commander of The Order of the British Empire (Civil) in 1975, for services to medicine; appointed a Companion of the Order of Australia; first woman to become President of the Royal Australasian College of Physicians (1986–1988); won Australian Achiever Award in 1997 for a lifetime's work in renal health
 Raymond Dart, Dean of the Faculty of Medicine, 1925-1943, the longest term of service in that capacity; announced the discovery of the Taung skull, the first of Africa's early hominids, and named the species Australopithecus Africanus
 Rhian Touyz, MBBCh, MSc (Med), PhD, FRCP, FRSE,[1] FMedSci, FCAHS[2] is a Canadian medical researcher
Salome Maswime, obstetrician-gynecologist, global health expert and activist
 Saul Levin, U.S.-based psychiatrist
 Selig Percy Amoils, Inventor of the Cryoprobe, recipient of the silver Order of Mapungubwe in 2006
 Shereen Usdin, public health specialist
 Sir Terence English, cardiac surgeon who performed the first successful heart transplant in the UK in 1979 
 Sydney Brenner, biologist; 2002 Nobel laureate in Physiology or Medicine, shared with H. Robert Horvitz and John Sulston
 Sylvia Weir, pioneered the use of robotics in autism therapy
 William Harding le Riche, epidemiologist; established the first non-segregated health centre in Knysna

Politics and public service
 Nelson Mandela, South Africa's first democratically elected president, Nobel Peace Prize winner
Athol Williams, state capture whistleblower and anti-corruption advocate
 Ishtar Lakhani, feminist activist
 Achille Mbembe, philosopher and political scientist, staff member at Wits Institute for Social and Economic Research
 Adrian Guelke, political scientist
 Ahmed Kathrada, politician, anti-apartheid activist and political prisoner
 Ellen Hellmann, social anthropologist
 Barbara Hogan, Minister of Public Enterprises in the Cabinet of South Africa; former Minister of Health
 Baron Joel Joffe, human rights lawyer who represented Nelson Mandela in the Rivonia Trial
 Bernard Friedman, senior lecturer in otolaryngology; founder of the Progressive Party
 Connie Mulder, former politician
 David Webster, social anthropologist and anti-apartheid activist
 Dennis Brutus, former political activist and poet
Dion George, politician
 Eduardo Mondlane, father of Mozambican independence
 Essop Pahad, anti-apartheid activist and politician
 Geoff Makhubo, mayor of the City of Johannesburg
 Gwede Mantashe, politician; ANC secretary general and chairperson of the South African Communist Party
 Harry Schwarz, lawyer, politician, ambassador to United States and anti-apartheid leader
 Helen Suzman, anti-apartheid activist and member of Parliament
 Helen Zille, leader of the Democratic Alliance
 Jan Hofmeyr, politician
 Jef Valkeniers, doctor and politician
 Joe Slovo, Communist politician; long-time leader of the South African Communist Party; leading member of the African National Congress
 John Matisonn, political journalist and author
 Lucien van der Walt, sociologist and co-author, along with Michael Schmidt, of Black Flame: The Revolutionary Class Politics of Anarchism and Syndicalism (Counter-Power vol. 1)''
 Mamphela Ramphele, academic, businesswoman, medical doctor and anti-apartheid activist
 Mmusi Maimane, politician and former DA leader
 Natan Gamedze, Swazi Prince, Supreme Court Translator and Orthodox rabbi
 Regina Twala, political activist and the first Black woman to graduate from the university
 Robert Sobukwe, political dissident; founded the Pan Africanist Congress in opposition to the apartheid regime
 Rupert Taylor, political scientist
 Ruth First, anti-apartheid activist and scholar
 Sir Michael Bear, former Lord Mayor of London 2010/11
 Solly Malatsi, spokesperson of the DA
 Teresa Heinz Kerry, philanthropist, wife of U.S. Senator John Kerry
 Thulas Nxesi, Minister of Public Works
 Thuli Madonsela, Public Protector of South Africa
 Tony Leon, politician and former leader of the Democratic Alliance
 Tshilidzi Marwala, academic, businessman and political theorist
 Vivienne Thom, Australian former public servant and current independent consultant and intelligence specialist
 Winnie Madikizela-Mandela, Political activist during apartheid.

Science and technology

 Lucinda Backwell, paleoanthropologist
 Aaron Klug, Nobel Prize in Chemistry, 1982
 Audrey Richards, social anthropologist
 Botha de Meillon (BSc 1925; BSc Hons 1926; MSc 1927; Honorary Doctorate in Science 1932; Honorary Doctorate in Medicine 1975) was a founding member of the Entomological Society of Southern Africa and was awarded life membership in 1986. Born Schalk Jacobus Botha de Meillon on 15 October 1902 in Prieska, northern Cape Province, this pioneering South African scientist passed away peacefully in the U.S.A. on 6 December 2000 at age 98.
 Danie G. Krige, mining engineer who pioneered the field of geostatistics
 David Forsyth, computer vision researcher at University of Illinois Urbana-Champaign
 D. G. M. Wood-Gush, was a South African-born animal geneticist and ethologist
 David King, is a South African-born British chemist, academic, and head of the Climate Crisis Advisory Group.
 Deborah James, anthropologist
 John Edmund Kerrich, first head of the Statistics department. Famous for experiments in probability performed while interned (in Denmark) during the second world war.
 David Lewis-Williams, Professor emeritus of Cognitive Archaeology at the University of the Witwatersrand; specialist in Upper-Palaeolithic and Bushmen rock art; founder of the Rock Art Research Institute at the University of the Witwatersrand
 David Pettifor, physicist
 Doris Kuhlmann-Wilsdorf, known for her work in materials science
 Bernie Fanaroff, physicist and Project Director at South African Square Kilometre Array Project
 Frank Nabarro, solid state physicist, DVC
 Friedel Sellschop, physicist
 H. J. De Blij, geographer, professor, television personality, analyst
 Helen Nissenbaum, scholar of online privacy and security; professor of information science at Cornell Tech
 Herbert Sichel, statistician
 Himla Soodyall, geneticist
 James Kitching, Karooo paleontologist
 Jan C. A. Boeyens, chemist
 John Burland, Emeritus Professor and Senior Research Investigator at the Department of Civil and Environmental Engineering of Imperial College London; Professor of Geotechnical Engineering at the Imperial College, London; led the international consulting team that stabilized the leaning tower of Pisa; one of the few engineers to be elected a Fellow of the Royal Society 
 Kim Man Lui, software engineer
 Lee Berger, paleoanthropologist, winner of the first National Geographic Prize for Research and Exploration
 Lewis Wolpert, graduated in Civil Engineering; studied biology at Imperial College; Professor of Biology Applied to Medicine at University College, London; Fellow of the Royal Society; popular science lecturer and writer
 Marlene Behrmann, cognitive neuroscientist specializing in visual perception, specifically object recognition; professor at Carnegie Mellon University
 Max Gluckman, anthropologist
 Peter Sarnak, mathematician, head of School of Mathematics at Princeton, Honorary degree recipient in 2014 (DSc)
 Phillip Tobias, paleoanthropologist and anatomist
 Raymond Dart, anatomist and anthropologist; discoverer of the Taung Child
 Ron Clarke, paleoanthropologist
 Beric Skews scientist, faculty member
 Selig Percy Amoils, ophthalmologist and biomedical engineering inventor
 Seymour Papert, artificial intelligence pioneer and inventor of the Logo programming language
 Sir Basil Schonland, Honorary Doctor of Science (1957); founding director of the Bernard Price Institute of Geophysics at the University of the Witwatersrand; made significant contributions to the study of atmospheric electricity, photographing lightning and investigating the electric fields generated by thunderclouds
 Tingye Li; pioneer in lasers and optical communication
 Wanda Orlikowski, information systems scholar
 Susan Shore (scientist), audiologist and innovator

Sports
 Ali Bacher, former Test cricketer and an administrator of the United Cricket Board of South Africa
 Gary Bailey, football (played for England)

 Hugh Baiocchi, golf
 Gordon Day, sprinter
 Bruce Fordyce, marathon and ultramarathon athlete who won the Comrades Marathon a record nine times (eight times consecutively)
 Chick Henderson, rugby union footballer and commentator
 Ian Holding, squash
 Stephen Jack, cricket
 Joe Kaminer, rugby
 Syd Levy (born 1922), tennis player; competed at Wimbledon, the French Championships, the U.S. Open, and Davis Cup, and won a silver medal at the Maccabiah Games
 George Mallory, first South African to summit Mount Everest (in the footsteps of his grandfather, of the same name)
 Alan Menter, chosen for the Springbok rugby team in 1968
 Paul Nash, sprinter
 Mark Plaatjes, marathon runner
 Hendrik Ramaala, winner of the 2004 New York City Marathon and 2004 Mumbai Marathon; has two silver medals from the IAAF World Half Marathon Championships in 1998 and 1999; in 2006 he won the men's Great North Run; two-time national champion in the 5.000 metres
 Odette Richard, gymnastics
 Wilf Rosenberg, rugby
 Richard Snell, cricketer
 Mandy Yachad, former cricketer and field hockey player who represented the South African national team in both sports

Miscellaneous
 Akiva Tatz, rabbi, medical ethicist, author and orator
 Cedric Phatudi
 Giles Henderson, CBE, Master of Pembroke College, Oxford
 Imran Garda, news anchor for Al Jazeera English.
 Jonathan Drummond-Webb
 Ken Costa, Chairman of Alpha International
 Thabo Makgoba, South African Anglican Archbishop of Cape Town
 Robin Cohen, social scientist

See also 
 List of vice-chancellors and chancellors of the University of the Witwatersrand

References

University
People associated with the University of the Witwatersrand
Wits